"Time Today" is a song by American rapper Moneybagg Yo. It was released as the lead single of his fourth studio album, A Gangsta's Pain, on February 3, 2021. It was produced by Real Red and YC, who both wrote the song with him, and peaked at number 31 on the Billboard Hot 100.

Composition and critical reception
The "bass heavy" song finds Moneybagg Yo rapping about gossip around him and being the center of attention, over "YC's utterly gargantuan 808 blasts". On Consequence of Sound, Eli Enis writes that the song is "essentially one long flex against Moneybagg's unnamed haters, but it's a lot more fun and bouncy than it is bitter", and that "His flow is sturdy yet flexible, and his voice has the baritone-esque oomph of rappers like DaBaby and Young Dolph."

Music video
A music video for the song was released alongside the single. In it, Moneybagg Yo is followed by paparazzi in a grocery store, and he also addresses rumors about him and his haters in a press conference on a faux news channel. At home, he watches himself on television, switching between the press conference to a spoof of the TV series Girlfriends, in which he plays the role of William Dent.

Charts

Weekly charts

Year-end charts

Certifications

References

2021 singles
2021 songs
Moneybagg Yo songs
Interscope Records singles